John Todd, D.D. was an Anglican bishop in the early seventeenth century.

A former Jesuit, he was appointed Dean of Cashel early in 1606. He was appointed  Bishop of Down and Connor in 1607; and held this see until he was deprived in 1612.

References

Anglican bishops of Dromore
17th-century Anglican bishops in Ireland
Deans of Cashel
Bishops of Down and Connor